Giovanni Benfratello (1888 – 9 February 1966) was an Italian fencer. He competed in the individual and team sabre events at the 1912 Summer Olympics.

References

External links
 

1888 births
1966 deaths
Sportspeople from Palermo
Italian male fencers
Olympic fencers of Italy
Fencers at the 1912 Summer Olympics
Date of birth missing